Haplochromis is a ray-finned fish genus in the family Cichlidae. It has been used as the default "wastebin taxon" for Pseudocrenilabrinae cichlids of the East African Rift, and as such became the "largest" fish "genus". Many of these cichlids are popular aquarium fishes; like similar Haplochromini they are known as "haplos", "happies" or "haps" among aquarium enthusiasts.

The genus was established by F.M. Hilgendorf in 1888. It was originally conceived as a subgenus of A.C.L.G. Günther's "Chromis", at that time an even larger "wastebin genus" for Pseudocrenilabrinae cichlids. The type species of Hilgendorf was H. obliquidens. "Chromis" of Günther turned out to be a junior homonym of G. Cuvier's ocean fish genus Chromis, already established in 1814, and was abolished. As the years went by, other genera of (mostly) Haplochromini were lumped with and split again from Haplochromis, and the final delimitation of the clade around H. obliquidens is not yet done.

Extinction crisis in Lake Victoria

The introduction of Nile perch (Lates niloticus) to Lake Victoria after 1954 severely upset the lake's ecosystem. By the late 1970s, the perch's population was approaching carrying capacity, and the smaller cichlids were fair game for the huge carnivorous Lates, the Nile tilapia (Oreochromis niloticus), an adaptable generalist, was also introduced and competed with the often specialized endemic cichlids of the lake for food and other resources. When the Nile perch stocks finally declined again in the late 1980s, an estimated 200 Haplochromini species (mostly Haplochromis) may have become extinct – many of these had only been scientifically described a few years before their demise, and additional ones were only known or suspected to exist, but never properly studied or described.

While the stocks of those species that survived are in many cases recovering, the lake ecosystem has changed irrevocably. The entire trophic web has been observed to be upset. But still, evolution runs its course: those Lake Victoria Haplochromis species that still exist are in many cases adapting to new food sources, and in time, speciation is likely to set in and produce a new adaptive radiation of these fishes. Until then, however, the ecological balance of the lake is still on the brink, and many of the cichlids that survived the peak population of Lates are still critically endangered and close to extinction.

Systematics and taxonomy
Haplochromis is the type genus of the tribe Haplochromini. Most of the tribe's members were at one time or another included in the present genus, but in many cases this was only temporary. Around the year 1900, as well 100 years later, the trend was to split up the genus; especially in the mid-20th century, on the other hand, most authors lumped any and all Haplochromini that were not conspicuously distinct in the type genus.

While a number of African Rift Valley cichlids are certainly very close relatives of H. obliquidens, the type species of the present genus, it is not very clear where to draw the boundary of Haplochromis with regard to its relatives. Still, several genera are now recognized as distinct by many authors and scientific databases, such as FishBase (see below); in particular the Haplochromini from Lake Tanganyika and Lake Malawi are usually removed from Haplochromis. The genus delimitation in the entire tribe remains badly resolved, however, and further changes in taxonomy are likely in the future. In particular, between Haplochromis, Astatotilapia and Thoracochromis, species have been moved to and from over the years. The habit of Pseudocrenilabrinae to hybridize is hampering molecular phylogenetic studies based on mtDNA alone, while trophic morphs of a single species may appear to be distinct "species" if they are not phylogenetically studied. Several proposed genera are again included in Haplochromis at present, but it cannot be ruled out that some of these will eventually be recognized as valid again.

Species
There are currently 229 recognized species in this genus:

 Haplochromis acidens Greenwood, 1967
 Haplochromis adolphifrederici Boulenger, 1914
 Haplochromis aelocephalus Greenwood, 1959
 Haplochromis aeneocolor Greenwood, 1973
 Haplochromis akika Lippitsch, 2003
 Haplochromis albertianus Regan, 1929
 Haplochromis altigenis Regan, 1922
 Haplochromis ampullarostratus Schraml, 2004
 Haplochromis angustifrons Boulenger, 1914
 Haplochromis annectidens Trewavas, 1933
 Haplochromis antleter Mietes & F. Witte, 2010 
 Haplochromis apogonoides Greenwood, 1967
 Haplochromis arcanus Greenwood & Gee, 1969
 Haplochromis argens de Zeeuw, Westbroek & F. Witte, 2013
 Haplochromis argenteus Regan, 1922
 Haplochromis artaxerxes Greenwood, 1962
 Haplochromis astatodon Regan, 1921
 Haplochromis avium Regan, 1929
 Haplochromis azureus Seehausen & Lippitsch, 1998
 Haplochromis barbarae Greenwood, 1967
 Haplochromis bareli van Oijen, 1991
 Haplochromis bartoni Greenwood, 1962
 Haplochromis bayoni Boulenger, 1909
 Haplochromis beadlei Trewavas, 1933
 Haplochromis bicolor Boulenger, 1906
 Haplochromis boops Greenwood, 1967
 Haplochromis brownae Greenwood, 1962
 Haplochromis bullatus Trewavas, 1938
 Haplochromis bwathondii Niemantsverdriet & F. Witte, 2010 
 Haplochromis cassius Greenwood & Barel, 1978
 Haplochromis cavifrons Hilgendorf, 1888
 Haplochromis chilotes Boulenger, 1911
 Haplochromis chlorochrous Greenwood & Gee, 1969
 Haplochromis chromogynos Greenwood, 1959
 Haplochromis chrysogynaion van Oijen, 1991
 Haplochromis cinctus Greenwood & Gee, 1969 
 Haplochromis cinereus Boulenger, 1906
 Haplochromis cnester F. Witte & Witte-Maas, 1981
 Haplochromis commutabilis Schraml, 2004 (Kachira blue)
 Haplochromis coprologus Niemantsverdriet & F. Witte, 2010 
 Haplochromis crassilabris Boulenger, 1906
 Haplochromis crebridens Snoeks, De Vos, Coenen & Thys van den Audenaerde, 1990
 Haplochromis crocopeplus Greenwood & Barel, 1978
 Haplochromis cronus Greenwood, 1959
 Haplochromis cryptodon Greenwood, 1959
 Haplochromis cryptogramma Greenwood & Gee, 1969
 Haplochromis cyaneus Seehausen, Bouton & Zwennes, 1998
 Haplochromis decticostoma Greenwood & Gee, 1969
 Haplochromis degeni Boulenger, 1906
 Haplochromis dentex Regan, 1922
 Haplochromis dichrourus Regan, 1922
 Haplochromis diplotaenia Regan & Trewavas, 1928
 Haplochromis dolichorhynchus Greenwood & Gee, 1969
 Haplochromis dolorosus Trewavas, 1933
 Haplochromis eduardianus Boulenger, 1914
 Haplochromis eduardii Regan, 1921
 Haplochromis elegans Trewavas, 1933
 Haplochromis empodisma Greenwood, 1960
 Haplochromis engystoma Trewavas, 1933
 Haplochromis erythrocephalus Greenwood & Gee, 1969
 Haplochromis erythromaculatus De Vos, Snoeks & Thys van den Audenaerde, 1991
 Haplochromis estor Regan, 1929 
 Haplochromis eutaenia Regan & Trewavas, 1928
 Haplochromis exspectatus Schraml, 2004
 Haplochromis fischeri Seegers, 2008
 Haplochromis flavipinnis Boulenger, 1906
 Haplochromis flavus Seehausen, Zwennes & Lippitsch, 1998
 Haplochromis fuelleborni Hilgendorf & Pappenheim, 1903 (Fuelleborn's mouthbrooder)
 Haplochromis fuscus Regan, 1925
 Haplochromis fusiformis Greenwood & Gee, 1969
 Haplochromis gigas Seehausen & Lippitsch, 1998
 Haplochromis gigliolii Pfeffer, 1896
 Haplochromis gilberti Greenwood & Gee, 1969
 Haplochromis goldschmidti F. Witte, Westbroek & de Zeeuw, 2013
 Haplochromis gowersii Trewavas, 1928
 Haplochromis gracilior Boulenger, 1914 (Torpedostripe haplochromis)
 Haplochromis granti Boulenger, 1906
 Haplochromis graueri Boulenger, 1914
 Haplochromis greenwoodi Seehausen & Bouton, 1998
 Haplochromis guiarti Pellegrin, 1904
 Haplochromis harpakteridion van Oijen, 1991
 Haplochromis heusinkveldi F. Wittee & Witte-Maas, 1987
 Haplochromis hiatus Hoogerhoud & F. Witte, 1981
 Haplochromis howesi van Oijen, 1992
 Haplochromis humilior Boulenger, 1911
 Haplochromis humilis Steindachner, 1866
 Haplochromis igneopinnis Seehausen & Lippitsch, 1998
 Haplochromis insidiae Snoeks, 1994
 Haplochromis iris Hoogerhoud & F. Witte, 1981
 Haplochromis ishmaeli Boulenger, 1906
 Haplochromis kamiranzovu Snoeks, Coenen & Thys van den Audenaerde, 1984
 Haplochromis katavi Seegers, 1996 (Katavi mouthbrooder)
 Haplochromis katonga Schraml & Tichy, 2010
 Haplochromis katunzii ter Huurne & F. Witte, 2010 
 Haplochromis kujunjui van Oijen, 1991
 Haplochromis labiatus Trewavas, 1933
 Haplochromis labriformis Nichols & La Monte, 1938
 Haplochromis lacrimosus Boulenger, 1906
 Haplochromis laparogramma Greenwood & Gee, 1969
 Haplochromis latifasciatus Regan, 1929
 Haplochromis limax Trewavas, 1933
 Haplochromis lividus Greenwood, 1956
 Haplochromis loati Greenwood, 1971
 Haplochromis longirostris Hilgendorf, 1888
 Haplochromis luteus Seehausen & Bouton, 1998
 Haplochromis macconneli Greenwood, 1974
 Haplochromis macrocephalus Seehausen & Bouton, 1998
 Haplochromis macrognathus Regan, 1922
 Haplochromis macrops Boulenger, 1911
 Haplochromis macropsoides Greenwood, 1973
 Haplochromis maculipinna Pellegrin, 1913
 Haplochromis mahagiensis L. R. David & Poll, 1937
 Haplochromis maisomei van Oijen, 1991
 Haplochromis malacophagus Poll & Damas, 1939
 Haplochromis mandibularis Greenwood, 1962
 Haplochromis martini Boulenger, 1906
 Haplochromis maxillaris Trewavas, 1928
 Haplochromis mbipi Lippitsch & Bouton, 1998
 Haplochromis megalops Greenwood & Gee, 1969
 Haplochromis melanopterus Trewavas, 1928
 Haplochromis melanopus Regan, 1922
 Haplochromis melichrous Greenwood & Gee, 1969
 Haplochromis mentatus Regan, 1925
 Haplochromis mento Regan, 1922
 Haplochromis michaeli Trewavas, 1928
 Haplochromis microchrysomelas Snoeks, 1994
 Haplochromis microdon Boulenger, 1906
 Haplochromis multiocellatus Boulenger, 1913
 Haplochromis mylergates Greenwood & Barel, 1978
 Haplochromis mylodon Greenwood, 1973
 Haplochromis nanoserranus Greenwood & Barel, 1978
 Haplochromis nigrescens Pellegrin, 1909
 Haplochromis nigricans Boulenger, 1906
 Haplochromis nigripinnis Regan, 1921
 Haplochromis nigroides Pellegrin, 1928
 Haplochromis niloticus Greenwood, 1960
 Haplochromis nubilus Boulenger, 1906 (Blue Victoria mouthbrooder)
 Haplochromis nuchisquamulatus Hilgendorf, 1888
 Haplochromis nyanzae Greenwood, 1962
 Haplochromis nyererei Witte-Maas & F. Witte, 1985
 Haplochromis obesus Boulenger, 1906
 Haplochromis obliquidens Hilgendorf, 1888
 Haplochromis obtusidens Trewavas, 1928
 Haplochromis occultidens Snoeks, 1988
 Haplochromis oligolepis Lippitsch, 2003
 Haplochromis olivaceus Snoeks, De Vos, Coenen & Thys van den Audenaerde, 1990
 Haplochromis omnicaeruleus Seehausen & Bouton, 1998
 Haplochromis oregosoma Greenwood, 1973
 Haplochromis orthostoma Regan, 1922
 Haplochromis pachycephalus Greenwood, 1967
 Haplochromis pallidus Boulenger, 1911
 Haplochromis pancitrinus Mietes & F. Witte, 2010 
 Haplochromis pappenheimi Boulenger, 1914
 Haplochromis paradoxus Lippitsch & Kaufman, 2003
 Haplochromis paraguiarti Greenwood, 1967
 Haplochromis paraplagiostoma Greenwood & Gee, 1969
 Haplochromis paropius Greenwood & Gee, 1969
 Haplochromis parorthostoma Greenwood, 1967
 Haplochromis parvidens Boulenger, 1911
 Haplochromis paucidens Regan, 1921
 Haplochromis pellegrini Regan, 1922
 Haplochromis percoides Boulenger, 1906
 Haplochromis perrieri Pellegrin, 1909
 Haplochromis petronius Greenwood, 1973
 Haplochromis pharyngalis Poll & Damas, 1939
 Haplochromis pharyngomylus Regan, 1929
 Haplochromis phytophagus Greenwood, 1966
 Haplochromis piceatus Greenwood & Gee, 1969
 Haplochromis pitmani Fowler, 1936	
 Haplochromis placodus Poll & Damas, 1939
 Haplochromis plagiodon Regan & Trewavas, 1928
 Haplochromis plagiostoma Regan, 1922
 Haplochromis plutonius Greenwood & Barel, 1978
 Haplochromis prodromus Trewavas, 1935
 Haplochromis prognathus Pellegrin, 1904
 Haplochromis pseudopellegrini Greenwood, 1967
 Haplochromis ptistes Greenwood & Barel, 1978
 Haplochromis pundamilia Seehausen & Bouton, 1998
 Haplochromis pyrrhocephalus F. Witte & Witte-Maas, 1987
 Haplochromis pyrrhopteryx van Oijen, 1991
 Haplochromis retrodens Hilgendorf, 1888
 Haplochromis riponianus Boulenger, 1911
 Haplochromis rubescens Snoeks, 1994
 Haplochromis rubripinnis Seehausen, Lippitsch & Bouton, 1998
 Haplochromis rudolfianus Trewavas, 1933
 Haplochromis rufocaudalis Seehausen & Bouton, 1998
 Haplochromis rufus Seehausen & Lippitsch, 1998
 Haplochromis sauvagei Pfeffer, 1896
 Haplochromis saxicola Greenwood, 1960
 Haplochromis scheffersi Snoeks, De Vos & Thys van den Audenaerde, 1987
 Haplochromis schubotzi Boulenger, 1914
 Haplochromis schubotziellus Greenwood, 1973
 Haplochromis serranus Pfeffer, 1896
 Haplochromis serridens Regan, 1925
 Haplochromis simotes Boulenger, 1911
 Haplochromis simpsoni Greenwood, 1965
 Haplochromis smithii Castelnau, 1861
 Haplochromis snoeksi Wamuini Lunkayilakio & Vreven, 2010 <ref>{{cite journal| url=http://www.pfeil-verlag.de/04biol/pdf/ief21_3_08.pdf| title=Haplochromis' snoeksi, a new species from the Inkisi River basin, Lower Congo (Perciformes: Cichlidae)|last=Wamuini Lunkayilakio|author2=Vreven|journal=Ichthyological Exploration of Freshwaters|year=2010|volume=21|issue=3|pages=279–287}}</ref>
 Haplochromis spekii Boulenger, 1906
 Haplochromis sphex ter Huurne & F. Witte, 2010 
 Haplochromis squamipinnis Regan, 1921
 Haplochromis squamulatus Regan, 1922
 Haplochromis sulphureus Greenwood & Barel, 1978
 Haplochromis tanaos van Oijen & F. Witte, 1996
 Haplochromis taurinus Trewavas, 1933
 Haplochromis teegelaari Greenwood & Barel, 1978
 Haplochromis teunisrasi F. Witte & Witte-Maas, 1981
 Haplochromis theliodon Greenwood, 1960
 Haplochromis thereuterion van Oijen & F. Witte, 1996
 Haplochromis thuragnathus Greenwood, 1967
 Haplochromis tridens Regan & Trewavas, 1928
 Haplochromis turkanae Greenwood, 1974 (Turkana haplo)
 Haplochromis tyrianthinus Greenwood & Gee, 1969
 Haplochromis ushindi van Oijen, 2004
 Haplochromis vanheusdeni F. D. B. Schedel, Friel & U. K. Schliewen, 2014 
 Haplochromis vanoijeni de Zeeuw & F. Witte, 2010 
 Haplochromis velifer Trewavas, 1933
 Haplochromis venator Greenwood, 1965
 Haplochromis vicarius Trewavas, 1933
 Haplochromis victoriae Greenwood, 1956
 Haplochromis victorianus Pellegrin, 1904
 Haplochromis vittatus Boulenger, 1901
 Haplochromis vonlinnei van Oijen & de Zeeuw, 2008 
 Haplochromis welcommei Greenwood, 1966
 Haplochromis worthingtoni Regan, 1929
 Haplochromis xanthopteryx Seehausen & Bouton, 1998
 Haplochromis xenognathus Greenwood, 1957
 Haplochromis xenostoma Regan, 1922

Undescribed species
These populations are typically referred to by the names they have in the aquarium fish trade. A number of them are likely to represent undescribed distinct species; others might just be subspecies or color morphs. Whether they all belong in Haplochromis is, of course, doubtful. Some of these populations are:

 Haplochromis aff. bloyeti
 Haplochromis sp. '75'
 Haplochromis sp. 'Amboseli'
 Haplochromis sp. 'backflash cryptodon'
 Haplochromis sp. 'black cryptodon'
 Haplochromis sp. 'Chala'
 Haplochromis sp. 'dusky wine-red fin'
 Haplochromis sp. 'frogmouth'
 Haplochromis sp. 'Kyoga flameback'
 Haplochromis sp. 'long snout'
 Haplochromis sp. 'Migori'
 Haplochromis sp. 'nigrofasciatus'
 Haplochromis sp. 'parvidens-like'
 Haplochromis sp. 'purple head'
 Haplochromis sp. 'ruby'
 Haplochromis sp. 'Rusinga oral sheller'
 Haplochromis sp. 'rainbow sheller'
 Haplochromis sp. 'small obesoid'

Formerly in Haplochromis

Among other genera of Haplochromini that were formerly included here, many are small or monotypic. The distinctness of these is highly doubtful, as they may just be distinct lineages of Haplochromis or other haplochromines. That nonwithstanding, Haplochromini genera to which some former "Haplochromis" have been removed are in particular:

 Astatoreochromis (3 species)
 Astatotilapia (8 described species)
 Aulonocara (22 species)
 Buccochromis (7 species)
 Caprichromis (2 species)
 Champsochromis (2 species)
 Cheilochromis (monotypic)
 Chetia (6 species)
 Copadichromis (25 described species)
 Ctenochromis (5 living and 1 extinct described species)
 Ctenopharynx (3 species)
 Cyrtocara (monotypic)
 Dimidiochromis (4 species)
 Eclectochromis (2 species)
 Fossorochromis (monotypic)
 Hemitaeniochromis (monotypic)
 Lethrinops (24 species)
 Maylandia/Metriaclima (25 species)
 Mchenga (6 species)
 Melanochromis (27 species)
 Mylochromis (21 species)
 Naevochromis (monotypic)
 Nimbochromis (5 species)
 Nyassachromis (8 species)
 Orthochromis (14 species)
 Otopharynx (13 species)
 Pharyngochromis (2 species)
 Placidochromis (43 species)
 Protomelas (15 species)
 Pundamilia (4 species)
 Pseudocrenilabrus (3 species)
 Sargochromis (8 species)
 Schwetzochromis (monotypic)
 Sciaenochromis (4 species)
 Stigmatochromis (4 species)
 Taeniochromis (monotypic)
 Taeniolethrinops (4 species)
 Thoracochromis (12 species)
 Tramitichromis (5 species)
 Trematocranus (3 species)
 Tyrannochromis (4 species)

Some other Pseudocrenilabrinae were also – mainly by early authors – included in Haplochromis, though they are not members of its tribe. These are:
 Anomalochromis thomasi of the Hemichromini
 Altolamprologus compressiceps of the Lamprologini
 Tilapia jallae of the Tilapiini

Synonyms of Haplochromis
With all the taxonomic and systematic confusion affecting Haplochromis and its allies, it is hardly surprising that the genus has a large number of junior synonyms. Most referred to small or monotypic genera that were once considered distinct, but are now included in Haplochromis again, if only to wait for a major review of their status. Synonyms are:

 Allochromis Greenwood, 1980
 Cleptochromis Greenwood, 1980
 Enterochromis Greenwood, 1980
 Gaurochromis Greenwood, 1980
 Harpagochromis Greenwood, 1980
 Labrochromis Regan, 1920
 Lipochromis Regan, 1920
 Platytaeniodus Boulenger, 1906
 Prognathochromis Greenwood, 1980
 Ptyochromis Greenwood, 1980
 Psammochromis Greenwood, 1980
 Tridontochromis Greenwood, 1980
 Xystichromis Greenwood, 1980
 Yssichromis Greenwood, 1980

Sometimes other genera listed above are also synonymized.

Footnotes

References

  [2009a]: Valid Haplochromis species. Retrieved 2009-OCT-03.
  [2009b]: Haplochromis taxa. Retrieved 2009-OCT-03.
  (2009): 2009 IUCN Red List of Threatened Species. Version 2009.1. Retrieved 2009-SEP-20.
  (2008): Dietary shift in benthivorous cichlids after the ecological changes in Lake Victoria. Anim. Biol. 58(4): 401-417.  (HTML abstract)
  (1994): African cichlids II: Cichlids from East Africa. A handbook for their identification, care and breeding. Tetra Press, Germany. 
  (2001): Classification and Phylogenetic Relationships of African Tilapiine Fishes Inferred from Mitochondrial DNA Sequences. Molecular Phylogenetics and Evolution'' 20'''(3): 361–374. 

 
Cichlid fish of Africa
Cichlid genera
Taxa named by Franz Martin Hilgendorf